The Gettysburg Rostrum is a Gettysburg Battlefield venue for historical commemorations which have included addresses by US Presidents Theodore Roosevelt (1904), William Howard Taft, Calvin Coolidge (1928), Herbert Hoover (1930), and Franklin D. Roosevelt (1934).  The facility has been most often used during Decoration Day (May) and Dedication Day (November) ceremonies, but has been used for other events such as the Pennsylvania Days commemoration during Camp Samuel Harper in September 1889.  Identified in 1908 as the location of the Gettysburg Address, the Rostrum and Soldiers' National Monument are each rejected by the NPS's modern Cemetery Walking Tour brochure. The brick pavilion was constructed in 1879 by  P. J. and J. J. Tawney, temporarily extended in 1904, and is planned for restoration by 2013 (the "treillage of the Rostrum" was restored prior to 1970.).

References

Buildings and structures in Adams County, Pennsylvania
Cemetery Hill
Pavilions in the United States